Pleasant Gehman is an American author, writer, poet,  actress,  dancer and musician from Los Angeles.

Career
In the 1980s, she was the singer for the punk rock band Screamin' Sirens.

Her articles on rock 'n' roll, American pop culture, sex, the arts and human interest have appeared in L.A. Weekly and BAM. She has written and edited a number of books, including  Showgirl Confidential, The Belly Dance Handbook, Senorita Sin, Princess of Hollywood, Escape From Houdini Mountain and The Underground Guide to Los Angeles.

In 1994, she recorded a collection of her poetry and spoken-word routines entitled Ruined. Among the venues where she has performed spoken-word pieces include The Unhappy Hour at the Parlour Club.

She co-starred in Margaret Cho's Off-Broadway variety show, The Sensuous Woman, in 2007  and again shared the stage with Cho in a 2012 Victory Variety Hour performance. 

She appeared as Estelle in Steve Balderson's film Firecracker.

In April 2009, Pleasant worked with cult director Steve Balderson for Stuck! - an homage to film noir women in prison dramas.  Co-starring Karen Black, Mink Stole, Susan Traylor, and The Go-Go's Jane Wiedlin. Stuck! was filmed in Macon, Georgia and released in 2010.

Books
Showgirl Confidential: My Life Onstage, Backstage And On The Road {Punk Hostage Press) ) The Belly Dance Handbook: A Companion For The Serious Dancer {Princess Productions} )
Escape From Houdini Mountain (Manic D Press)
Senorita Sin (1994, Incommunicado Press)
Princess Of Hollywood (1997, Incommunicado Press)
The Underground Guide To Los Angeles (1999, Manic D Press)

References

External links
 - official Pleasant Gehman site
 www.PrincessFarhana.com - Official Princess Farhana site
 www.stucknoir.com - Stuck! movie site
 Armendariz, Alicia (March 2005). "Women in L.A. Punk: Pleasant Gehman" - interview with Pleasant Gehaman
 3am Magazine - interview with Pleasant Gehman
 Gilded Serpent - article by Pleasant Gehman
 A Riotous Disarray - interview with Pleasant Gehman

American women poets
American women singers
American film actresses
American spoken word artists
1959 births
Living people
Actresses from Los Angeles
Singers from Los Angeles
American television actresses
American punk rock singers
American women journalists
21st-century American women
Women in punk